"Lords of the Boards" is the third single by the Guano Apes and the final single from their debut album Proud Like a God. The song reached number 10 in both Germany and Austria, and was certified gold in Germany in 1999. The song was commissioned for the 1998 European Snowboarding Championship.

Music videos
There are two official music videos for the song. One is compiled from footage of the Guano Apes performing live at several different locations, and the other shows the Guano Apes performing in a ski lodge, mixed with footage of them at a ski field as well as snowboarding clips.

Track listing

Charts

Weekly charts

Year-end charts

References

1998 singles
Guano Apes songs